The 2010 Japanese Regional Football Champions League was the 34th edition of the finals tournament (Dai 34 Kaizen Kokuchiiki Soccer League Keshōtaikai) was held from November 21 to December 5, 2010 in Ibaraki, Shizuoka, Kochi and It was the final tournament of the All Japan Regional Football League (currently the All Japan Regional Football Champions League) held in Chiba Prefecture.

Tournament outline 
For this tournament, the number of participating teams will be reduced from 16 to 12. As a result, the regulations were partially changed from the previous year.

In the first round, twelve teams will be divided into three groups and will play a round-robin of four, with the three first-place teams in each group and the best performing team from the three second-placed teams advancing to the final round. The final round will also be played by four teams in a round-robin league, with the 1st and 2nd place teams automatically promoted to the Japan Football League (JFL), the third-place team advancing to the JFL team reshuffle, the winning team becoming the JFL promoted team, and the losing team remaining in the regional league.

The match format was the same as the previous year, and in both the first round and the final round, if there is a tie in the first half of the second half, it will be played by a complete decision system in which a penalty shootout is played, and the winner = 3 points within the match time, the winner by penalty shootout = 2 points, the loser by penalty shootout = 1 point, the loser within the game time = 0 points, and the points will be allocated according to the following conditions, and "total points", "goal difference", "total number of goals", "results of the match between the teams" The ranking was determined by the order of. If the ranking was not determined by any of the above methods, a ranking match was held only if the first and second places were decided.

Venue

First round

Final round

Participating teams

Group 1 
The winners of their respective regional leagues in 2010. (9 teams)

Group 2 
Preferential treatment for clubs claiming to be members of the J. League. (1 Team)

Group 3 
Of the top four teams in the 46th All Japan Adult Football Championship, teams that have not qualified from their respective regional leagues. (up to 2 teams)
The following teams had already qualified.

 1st place Kamatamare Sanuki (1st place in Shikoku)
 2nd place AC Nagano Parceiro (1st place of Hokushinetsu 1st Division)
 3rd place SC Sagamihara (JFA preferential treatment)

Group 4 
If there are fewer than 12 teams under the above conditions, the number of teams registered as members of the All Japan Adult Football Federation as of the end of June 2010 will be replenished by rotating rotations (in FY2010, the order of the Kanto → Kansai → Kyushu).

Match schedule

First round

Group A

Group B

Group C

2nd place in each group

As a result, AC Nagano Parceiro qualified for the final round.

Final round

Final result 
As a result of the playoffs, the following were the results of the promotion to the Japan Football League (JFL):

Automatic Promotion

 1st Place - Kamatamare Sanuki
 2nd Place - AC Nagano Parceiro

Promotion / Relegation Playoff

 3rd Place - Sanyo Sumoto

References
 Japan Football Association - The 34th National Regional Football League Competition - Final Round 
 Japan Football Association - The 34th National Regional Football League Competition - Schedule and Results 
 Japan Football Association - The 34th National Regional Football League Competition - Tournament Outline 

2008
play